The 2015 Billings Wolves season was the team's first season as a professional indoor football franchise as an expansion team of the Indoor Football League (IFL). One of ten teams competing in the IFL for the 2015 season, the Billings, Montana-based Wolves were members of the Intense Conference.

Schedule
Key:

Regular season
All start times are local time

Standings

Roster

References

External links
Billings Wolves official website

Billings Wolves
Billings Wolves
Billings Wolves